Florian Grzechowiak (June 7, 1914 in Bottrop, Germany – July 24, 1972 in Poznań) was a Polish basketball player who competed in the 1936 Summer Olympics.

He was part of the Polish basketball team, which finished fourth in the Olympic tournament. He played five matches.

References

External links
profile

1914 births
1972 deaths
Polish men's basketball players
Olympic basketball players of Poland
Basketball players at the 1936 Summer Olympics
People from Bottrop
Sportspeople from Münster (region)
Lech Poznań (basketball) players
20th-century Polish people